North Macedonia's vehicle registration plates consist of a two-letter region code, followed by a 4-digit numeric and a 2-letter alpha code (e.g. SK 1234 AB).
Issuance of the new plates started on 20 February 2012, and they introduced a fourth digit and the blue field on the left side. The international country code NMK is applied (formerly MK) on the blue field on the left side of the plate.
NMK is only used in the car plates, while MK is still used for all other purposes. In February 2019, the country code was changed from MK to NMK, in accordance with the Prespa agreement which changed the country's name to Republic of North Macedonia. The new code is a mixture of English (North) and Macedonian (Makedonija).

A red and yellow badge appears between the area code and the numeric part, containing the equivalent Cyrillic letters to the four Latin letters. The letters Q, W, X and Y are not used as they have no equivalents in Cyrillic.

From 1993 to 20 February 2012, the ten existing codes were: BT, GV, KU, OH, PP, SK, SR, ST, TE, and VE.

On 20 February 2012, in addition to the ten existing codes, seven new codes were introduced: GE, KA, KI, KO, KP, RA, and SU.

On 1 March 2013, in addition to the seventeen existing codes, six new codes were introduced: BE, DE, NE, RE, SN, and VI.

On 1 September 2013, in addition to the twenty-three existing codes, one new code was introduced: VV.

On 4 July 2015, in addition to the twenty-four existing codes, seven new codes were introduced: DB, DK, MB, MK, KR, PS, and VA.

On 30 May 2019, in addition to the thirty-one existing codes, two new codes were introduced: DH and KS.

On 1 June 2020, in addition to the thirty-three existing codes, one new code was introduced: PE.

Codes
Vehicle registration plate codes by municipalities in English alphabetical order:

Obsolete licence plate codes

Critical reception
The new europlates are criticised from several design experts and the Macedonian public who insist on using hybrid alphabet instead of Latin script (only the common letters for Cyrillic and Latin scripts to be used). They sent a remark to the constitutional court of North Macedonia and the decision is yet to be declared. The MK/NMK code is also disputed for being placed low. Due to the Macedonia naming dispute, Greece followed a standard policy in which Greek border guards covered the letters MK on vehicle plates with a sticker, in Greek and English, reading: "Recognized by Greece as FYROM”.

Special plates
Diplomatic corps plate had black background and plate consists of two numbers indicating the country or diplomatic mission, two letters CC (for consular corps) or CD (for Diplomatic Corps) and then numbers.
Dealer plates had the band of text of region and then "ПРОБА". The bottom group exactly like older Yugoslav plates, but without the star.
Temporary plates use a system whereby the final letter of the group of two is replaced by the digit 9.
Police plates have six numbers in two groups and the font is blue. (rear only)
Taxi plates are the same as civilian plates, the only difference is that they have a yellow background.

List of Diplomatic Corps and International Organizations codes

Gallery

References

External links

Matrículas Information, maps and images about North Macedonia's plates 

North Macedonia
Road transport in North Macedonia
North Macedonia transport-related lists